Stenodermatinae is a large subfamily of bats in the family Phyllostomidae.

List of species
Subfamily Stenodermatinae
Genus: Ametrida
Little white-shouldered bat, Ametrida centurio
Genus: Ardops
Tree bat, Ardops nichollsi
Genus: Ariteus
Jamaican fig-eating bat, Ariteus flavescens
Genus: Artibeus - Neotropical fruit batsSubgenus: ArtibeusLarge fruit-eating bat, Artibeus amplusFringed fruit-eating bat, Artibeus fimbriatusFraternal fruit-eating bat, Artibeus fraterculusHairy fruit-eating bat, Artibeus hirsutusHonduran fruit-eating bat, Artibeus inopinatusJamaican fruit bat, Artibeus jamaicensisGreat fruit-eating bat, Artibeus lituratusDark fruit-eating bat, Artibeus obscurusFlat-faced fruit-eating bat, Artibeus planirostrisSubgenus: DermanuraAndersen's fruit-eating bat, Artibeus anderseniAztec fruit-eating bat, Artibeus aztecusBogota fruit-eating bat, Artibeus bogotensisGervais's fruit-eating bat, Artibeus cinereusSilver fruit-eating bat, Artibeus glaucusGnome fruit-eating bat, Artibeus gnomusSolitary fruit-eating bat, Artibeus incomitatusPygmy fruit-eating bat, Artibeus phaeotisRosenberg's fruit-eating bat, Artibeus rosenbergiToltec fruit-eating bat, Artibeus toltecusThomas's fruit-eating bat, Artibeus watsoniSubgenus: KoopmaniaBrown fruit-eating bat, Artibeus concolorGenus: CenturioWrinkle-faced bat, Centurio senexGenus: Chiroderma - big-eyed bats or white-lined bats
Brazilian big-eyed bat, Chiroderma doriaeGuadeloupe big-eyed bat, Chiroderma improvisumSalvin's big-eyed bat, Chiroderma salviniLittle big-eyed bat, Chiroderma trinitatumHairy big-eyed bat, Chiroderma villosumGenus: EctophyllaHonduran white bat, Ectophylla albaGenus: EnchisthenesVelvety fruit-eating bat, Enchisthenes hartiiGenus: MesophyllaMacConnell's bat, Mesophylla macconnelliGenus: Phyllops - Falcate-winged bats
Cuban fig-eating bat, Phyllops falcatusGenus: PlatyrrhinusAlberico's broad-nosed bat, Platyrrhinus albericoiPlatyrrhinus aquilusPlatyrrhinus angustirostrisEldorado broad-nosed bat, Platyrrhinus (Vampyrops) aurariusShort-headed broad-nosed bat, Platyrrhinus (Vampyrops) brachycephalusChoco broad-nosed bat, Platyrrhinus chocoensisThomas's broad-nosed bat, Platyrrhinus (Vampyrops) dorsalisPlatyrrhinus fusciventrisHeller's broad-nosed bat, Platyrrhinus (Vampyrops) helleriPlatyrrhinus incarumBuffy broad-nosed bat, Platyrrhinus (Vampyrops) infuscusIsmael's broad-nosed bat, Platyrrhinus ismaeliWhite-lined broad-nosed bat, Platyrrhinus (Vampyrops) lineatusQuechua broad-nosed bat, Platyrrhinus masuMatapalo broad-nosed bat, Platyrrhinus matapalensisGeoffroy's Rayed bat, Platyrrhinus nigellusPlatyrrhinus nitelineaRecife broad-nosed bat, Platyrrhinus (Vampyrops) recifinusShadowy broad-nosed bat, Platyrrhinus umbratusGreater broad-nosed bat, Platyrrhinus (Vampyrops) vittatusGenus: PygodermaIpanema bat, Pygoderma bilabiatumGenus: SphaeronycterisVisored bat, Sphaeronycteris toxophyllumGenus: StenodermaRed fruit bat, Stenoderma rufumGenus: Sturnira - yellow-shouldered bats or American Epauleted bats
Aratathomas's yellow-shouldered bat, Sturnira aratathomasiBidentate yellow-shouldered bat, Sturnira bidensBogota yellow-shouldered bat, Sturnira bogotensisHairy yellow-shouldered bat, Sturnira erythromosChocó yellow-shouldered bat, Sturnira koopmanhilliLittle yellow-shouldered bat, Sturnira liliumHighland yellow-shouldered bat, Sturnira ludoviciLouis's yellow-shouldered bat, Sturnira luisiGreater yellow-shouldered bat, Sturnira magnaMistratoan yellow-shouldered bat, Sturnira mistratensisTalamancan yellow-shouldered bat, Sturnira mordaxLesser yellow-shouldered bat, Sturnira nanaTschudi's yellow-shouldered bat, Sturnira oporaphilumSoriano's yellow-shouldered bat, Sturnira sorianoiThomas's yellow-shouldered bat, Sturnira thomasiTilda's yellow-shouldered bat, Sturnira tildaeGenus: Uroderma - Tent-building bats
Tent-making bat, Uroderma bilobatumBrown tent-making bat, Uroderma magnirostrumGenus: Vampyressa - yellow-eared bats
Bidentate yellow-eared bat, Vampyressa bidensBrock's yellow-eared bat, Vampyressa brockiMelissa's yellow-eared bat, Vampyressa melissaStriped yellow-eared bat, Vampyressa nymphaeaSouthern little yellow-eared bat, Vampyressa pusillaNorthern little yellow-eared bat, Vampyressa thyoneGenus: VampyrodesGreat stripe-faced bat, Vampyrodes caraccioli''

References

External links
 

Phyllostomidae
Mammal subfamilies
Taxa named by Paul Gervais